Carlos Noroña Gutiérrez (born 14 October 1956) is a Cuban sprinter. He competed in the men's 400 metres at the 1976 Summer Olympics.

References

1956 births
Living people
Athletes (track and field) at the 1976 Summer Olympics
Cuban male sprinters
Olympic athletes of Cuba
Place of birth missing (living people)
20th-century Cuban people